Roger Evernden (born ca. 1954) is a British enterprise architect, musician, composer, writer and speaker.

As an enterprise architect he is a consultant at the Cutter Consortium, known for his contributions to Enterprise Architecture and as author of the Information FrameWork, an enterprise architecture framework presented in 1996 as more generic alternative to the Zachman Framework.

As a musician and composer he is best known for his solo piano albums – Improvation (2014), The Journey We All Make (2016), The Innocence of Spring (2018), Nocturnes (2019), The Unfolding Of Wings (2020), Rainbows Of Hope (2020), and S L O W - Calm Piano for Mindful Yoga, Relaxation and Meditation (2020).

As a speaker he is known for his talks on enterprise architecture, and as a TEDx speaker.

Biography 
Evernden received his BA in History at the Lancaster University in 1975, and a Post-Graduate Certificate in Education at the Goldsmiths' College of the University of London in 1977.

Evernden started his career as history teacher in London in 1977. In 1980 he started working in IT as analyst and programmer, and worked his way up from consultant and application developer to enterprise architect working for companies as Legal & General, IBM, Westpac and smaller companies. From 2007 to 2011 he was Enterprise Domain Architect and later Enterprise Architect at Lloyds Bank. Since 2011 he is Senior Consultant with  Cutter Consortium's Business & Enterprise Architecture practice,

Work as an Enterprise Architect

Information FrameWork (IFW) 
In the late 1980s Evernden developed Information FrameWork (IFW) to describe an enterprise architect initiative at Westpac. This was later described in an IBM Systems Journal article, published in 1996. The Westpac project – known internally as CS90, or Core Systems for the 1990s – was a prototype for using enterprise architecture to create adaptive organizations or adaptive systems. The Westpac experience was described by Stephan H. Haeckel – an American management theorist and former director of Strategic Studies at IBM’s Advanced Business Institute – who developed the idea of the sense-and-respond organization as an adaptive enterprise.

The Information FrameWork (IFW) was presented in 1996 as framework for Information management, and more generic alternative to the Zachman Framework. Evernden (1996) explained:
the objectives and scope of IFW are broader than that of the original Zachman framework. IFW is described and compared with the original Zachman structure, showing the evolution, changes, and the rationale behind the changes based on experiences from within the financial services industry.
In his 1996 paper Evernden also showed "how the structure of IFW has been populated by industry-wide models and supported by a distinctive methodology. A detailed discussion of each of the six dimensions of the IFW architecture is presented."

Contributions to Enterprise Architecture 
Evernden has promoted the need for Architectural Thinking, the use of a meta-framework in Enterprise Architecture, and for explaining the Levels of Architectural Understanding.

Other works 
Evernden is co-author, with Elaine Evernden, of Information First: Integrating Knowledge and Information Architecture for Business Advantage, which was first published in 2003, expanding the concepts of Information FrameWork (IFW). Information First outlines an approach to enterprise architecture that uses eight factors common to all enterprise architecture frameworks that can be combined to create architectural tools for managing enterprise and business transformation. A second edition was published in 2015 with the title: Enterprise Architecture – the Eight Fundamental Factors.

This book deals with two important topics for enterprise management: the architecture of an enterprise and the challenge of dealing with information.

"Roger and Elaine Evernden argue that in order to address that challenge, organizations must treat information as a business resource, much like capital or labor. They require expertise and strategic thinking to use that resource as part of a business strategy, and to leverage its potential. More than just data to be used in operative processes, information must be seen as the essence of all decision-making and knowledge-building efforts in the enterprise, something that must be adapted to the people using it and interacting with it."

Research at the Cranfield School of Management also suggested that there are multiple dimensions to all architecture frameworks. Working with more than two or three dimensions at a time is challenging, and potentially confusing. Analysis is therefore most constructive when any two of these dimensions are viewed together in a matrix.

In 2008, at the height of the financial crisis of 2007–2008, he spoke about how enterprise architecture could be used to weather unpredictable events. In 2011 he described the architectural approach to create a single integrated IT platform from two heritage banking systems following the Lloyds TSB acquisition of HBOS to form Lloyds Banking Group January 2009.

In 2017 he presented a case study at Vesta Corporation describing a combination of online training and webinars in a nine-month program to build the capabilities and confidence of their enterprise architecture team.

In a keynote presentation for the National Conference on Advances in Enterprise Architecture (NCAEA 2017) he described changes required by architecture frameworks in response to an increasingly connected, digital world. He said: "Although our discipline will probably continue to be known as “enterprise” architecture, increasingly it will cover the architecture of any human-designed system – which includes all social, political, economic, environmental, and cultural organisms – in addition to the domains we currently expect to find in “enterprise” architecture. Enterprises, and governments, will need to  re-think governance of their EA."

Selected publications 
 Evernden, Roger. "The information framework." IBM Systems Journal 35.1 (1996): 37–68.
 Evernden, Roger, Information FrameWork (IFW): 1996 Systems Journal Article and 2011 Update, 2018
 Elaine Evernden, Roger Evernden. Information First. Elsevier, 2003/2012.
 Elaine Evernden, Roger Evernden. Enterprise Architecture – the Eight Fundamental Factors. CreateSpace, 2015, 
 Evernden, Roger, and Elaine Evernden. "Third-generation information architecture." Communications of the ACM 46.3 (2003): 95–98.
 Evernden, R. Mastering Complexity to Drive EA Productivity, Cutter Consortium Executive Report, Vol. 16, No. 1, 2013

Music 
During the 1970s and 1980s he played and wrote songs with bands, including Capital Chaps, and Watch My Lips.

He is a member of the SoloPiano community, home to over 350 solo piano artists from around the globe.

He also produces music under the alias Mi Fa Sol.

The new age album Glebe' (1990) was re-released in 2015.

Solo piano albums include:
 Improvation (2014) 
 The Journey We All Make  (2016) 
 The Innocence of Spring (2018) 
 Nocturnes (2019) 
 The Unfolding of Wings (2020) 
 Rainbows of Hope (2020) 
 S L O W - Calm Piano for Mindful Yoga, Relaxation and Meditation (2020) [with Mi Fa Sol] 
Deep and Crisp and Even: A Felt Piano Collection of Traditional Christmas Songs (2020) 
Old Souls Dream Young (2021) [with Mi Fa Sol] 
He has contributed tracks to five albums featuring other pianists:

 For Planet Earth included on the album Piano Reflections, Vol. 1, released by Collaborative Records in 2020. 
 Our Children's Children, Serendipity No. 7 included on the album Hope, released by Silent Beat Records in 2021 
 A Moment of Wintry Wonder included on the album A Time For Peace, released by Yellow Rose Records in 2021 
 Rebirth included on the album Piano Day 2022, released by Yellow Rose Records in 2022 
 Courage (Against Oppression) on the album ДОДОМУ I', a charity album released on Bandcamp in aid of the Ukrainian Red Cross 
He is a founding member of the Contemporary Classical Collective (CCC) - an informal group of musicians whose focus is on producing neo-classical or indie classical music.

References 

Year of birth missing (living people)
Living people
British computer scientists
British business theorists
Enterprise modelling experts